Darko Arsić (born 20 January 1989) is a Serbian handball player who plays for RK Metaloplastika and for the Serbia men's national handball team.

References
 Player Darko Arsić
 2016-17 season Darko Arsić
 2015-16 season Darko Arsić
 Darko Arsić

1989 births
Living people
Serbian male handball players
People from Vranje